The Diocese of George is a diocese in the Anglican Church of Southern Africa.

History

The seat of the diocese is the Cathedral of St Mark in George in South Africa.

List of Bishops
 Henry Bindley Sidwell 1911-1936
 Herbert Linford Gwyer 1937-1951
 John Hunter 1951-1966
 Patrick Harold Falkiner Barron 1966-1978
 William James Manning 1974-1984
 Derek George Damant 1984-1999
 Donald Frederick Harker 1999-2010
 Brian Melvin Marajh 2011-2021

Coat of arms 
The diocese assumed arms at the time of its inception, and had them granted by the College of Arms in 1953 : Argent, on water in base barry wavy an ancient ship under sail to the sinister proper, within a bordure Azure charged with eight plates, a canton Vair thereon a celestial crown Or surmounted by an anchor Sable.

References

External links
 

 
1911 establishments in South Africa
Anglican Church of Southern Africa dioceses